Alaphilippe is a French surname. Notable people with the surname include:

Bryan Alaphilippe (born 1995), French cyclist, brother of Julian
Camille Alaphilippe (1874 – after 1934), French sculptor
Julian Alaphilippe (born 1992), French cyclist

French-language surnames